Centennial High School is a public high school serving grades 9-12 in Champaign, Illinois, USA. It is part of Champaign Unit 4 School District. As of the 2020–21 school year, it had 1,400 students. The principal is Scott Savage. The school is located next to Jefferson Middle School and Centennial Park.

Curriculum
The school offers a variety of courses, including AP courses in Macroeconomics, English, Calculus AB or BC, Physics, Chemistry, Biology, US History, American Government, and Statistics. In addition, many consumer science and industrial technology courses are offered. The school also offers a Young Adult Program for students 18–21 years of age, which is based at Parkland College.
The student-teacher ratio is 16:1, average for the state.

Students
The school's student composition includes 26.7% low-income students. 0.7% of student are of limited English proficiency. There is a high school dropout rate of 1.8%.  The ethnic background of students includes 38% African-American, 35% White, 11% Asian, 10% Hispanic, 5% Multiracial, and 0.3% Native American.

Extracurricular activities

Athletics
Centennial competes in  interscholastic sports in the Big Twelve Conference (Illinois)  of the Illinois High School Association (IHSA).

Fall sports

Cheerleading
Boys cross-country
Girls cross-country
Football
Boys golf
Girls golf
Marching band
Boys soccer
Girls swimming and diving
Girls tennis
Volleyball

Winter sports

Boys basketball
Girls basketball
Cheerleading
Boys swimming and diving
Wrestling

Spring sports

Baseball
Girls soccer
Softball
Boys tennis
Boys track and field
Girls track and field

The girls tennis team won consecutive Illinois state championships in 1995 and 1996.

The school's basketball team also won their first state championship game in 2009, beating Oswego 61-59. They had a repeat appearance to the state championships in 2010, taking 4th place overall.

Clubs and organizations

Cheerleading
Color Guard
Dance Team
Journalism
Marching band
Key Club
Asian American Association
Gender & Sexualities Alliance
Math Team
Science Olympiad
Board Game Club
Ping Pong Club
Animal Club
Anime Club
Scholastic Bowl
National History Bowl
WYSE Team
Global Diffusion
Future Physicians of America
Speech Team
Rattle the Stars
CMN Dance Marathon
Thespian Troupe #1043

Empower
In 2011, Centennial High School hosted the inaugural Central Illinois History Bee and Bowl, a history quiz tournament which a team from Centennial also won.

Performance
In 2006, the school was named as one of the top 50 high schools in Illinois, according to the Chicago Sun-Times. In 2006, students' ACT scores exceeded both the state and national averages by about 2 points. In 2007, the school's scores on the Prairie State Achievement Examination (PSAE) Reading and Math tests exceeded the state averages, with around 60-65% of students meeting or exceeding state standards. Currently, the school is not making Adequate Yearly Progress (AYP).

Notable alumni
Bonnie Blair, multiple gold medalist in Olympic speed skating
Katherine Reutter, silver and bronze medalist in Olympic speed skating
Nichole Millage, gold medalist & two-time silver medalist in Paralympic sitting volleyball
Trent Meacham, graduate of Centennial, played on Illinois Fighting Illini men's basketball team
Rayvonte Rice, guard for 2013-2014 Illinois Fighting Illini men's basketball team
Mikel Leshoure, played football for Illinois, selected by Detroit Lions in 2011 NFL Draft
Matt Herges, pitcher for several MLB teams
Scott Nagy, basketball head coach at South Dakota State
Chantal Bailey, 1994 Olympics speed skating
Reggie Hodges,  punter for several NFL teams
Dan Hornbuckle, professional mixed martial arts fighter
James Kinney (class of 2009): professional basketball player
Gia Lewis-Smallwood, American discus player who competed in the 2012 Summer Olympics

References

External links
School website
School District website

Public high schools in Illinois
Schools in Champaign County, Illinois
Buildings and structures in Champaign, Illinois
1966 establishments in Illinois
educational institutions established in 1966